Ezhikkara is a panchayat in Paravur Taluk of Ernakulam District, Kerala. The North Paravur, Chathanad road (9 km) passes through this village. Ezhikkara is situated close to Ernakulam. Ezhikkara is famous for its pokkali (a type of rice) fields and prawn farms.

Geography
Ezhikkara is a quintessential Kerala village surrounded by lagoons and lush vegetation. Fishing and rice farming are the main source of income for the residents. Ezhikkara is famous for its Pokkali rice cultivations and fresh water prawn farms. The neighboring areas of the panchayat are Veeran Puzha part of NW-3 (Kollam-Kottapuram); Vypin Island in west, Kottuvally Panchayat in east; Kadamakkudy Panchayat in South and North Paravur Municipality in north.

Civic administration
Ezhikkara Panchayat is situated at Panchayathpadi. Ezhikkara panchayat belongs to Paravur Block Panchayat. Ezhikkara comes under Paravur Assembly constituency. These are the places or wards in this village: Chathanad, Kadakkara, Kedamangalam, Nanthiattukunam, Perumbadanna etc.

Politics
The current panchayat president of Ezikkara is K D Vincent

Public institutions
Govt Primary Health Centre, Ezhikkara
Govt Higher Secondary School, Ezhikkara
Govt LP School, Ezhikkara
SN Arts and Science College, Kedamangalam, Ezhikkara
St. Vincent Lower Primary School, Palliyakkal
Community Health Center, Ezhikkara

Public charitable institutions
Asraya Bhavan - Home for mentally challenged persons, Ezhikkara

Places of worship
Chathanad Sree Bhuvanaswari Temple
Chitteparambu Devi Temple
Palliyakkal Sri Dharmasastha Temple
Tharamel Sree Bhuvaneswari & Sree MahaVishnu Temple
Ezhikkara Sree Dharmasastha Temple
Vaniviharam Saraswathi Temple
Neendoothara Sri Dharmashastha Temple
St.Mary's Assumption Church, Ezhikkara
St. Mary's Jacobite Syrian Chapel
Arogyamatha Church, Kedamangalam
Ezhikkara Mosque
Kedamangalam Mosque
Ezhikara Juma Masjid
Perumpadanna Juma Masjid
St. Vincent Feror Church, Chathanad (Latin)
Infant Jesus church Kadakkara (Latin)
Edathuruth Vallor Muthan Temple
Edathuruth Vattathara Temple
 Vadakkekadakkara Puliyamppilly Temple

Notable people
 Shri Ananda Shivaram, Kathakali exponent and alumnus of Kerala Kalamandalam

Tharavads
There are many prominent and old Tharavads (joint nair family ancestral homes) in Ezhikkara dating back to the early 18th century. These Tharavads are characterized by their Nalukettu and Ettukettu building architecture, large swaths of rice fields and coconut groves, Ambalam (place of worship), Sarpakkavu (revered serpent abodes), Kulams (natural clear water ponds), festivities, customs and traditions that are quintessentially Kerala.

Places of interest
Gateway to Cherai
Chathanad kadavu
Pokkali fields
Kadakkara Boat Jetty and Toddy shop
Veeran puzha River

References

See also
 Paravur Taluk
 Ernakulam District

Villages in Ernakulam district
Suburbs of Kochi